Boyd C. Fugate (11 November 1884 – 24 April 1967) was a State Representative from Claiborne County, Tennessee.

Boyd Cleveland Fugate was born in Russell County, Virginia to parents Robert Boyd Fugate and Mary Anderson Wood, and grew up in Fugates Hill. In 1917 he married Rachel Parkey (1891–1947) who was the daughter of W. C. and Ollie Parkey, and owned property in Claiborne County, Tennessee. The couple located there to manage the farm near Tazewell. The Fugates had one son, William Parkey Fugate (1930–1940), who died of a childhood accident.

Boyd Fugate was a Democrat and served in the 77th General Assembly of the Tennessee House of Representatives, representing Claiborne County. He belonged to the Methodist Church and was a Freemason. He died in Tazewell, Tennessee, and was buried in the Irish Cemetery.

References

1884 births
1967 deaths
Methodists from Tennessee
People from Russell County, Virginia
Democratic Party members of the Tennessee House of Representatives
People from Claiborne County, Tennessee
20th-century American politicians